The Hunter–Fryingpan Wilderness is a U.S. Wilderness Area located in White River National Forest east of Aspen, Colorado. The  wilderness established in 1978 includes the headwaters of Hunter Creek and the Fryingpan River plus many peaks of the Williams Mountains. It borders on the Mount Massive Wilderness to the east, separated only by the continental divide.

Photo gallery

References

Wilderness areas of Colorado
Protected areas of Pitkin County, Colorado
Protected areas established in 1978
White River National Forest
1978 establishments in Colorado